Andrii Klymchuk (born December 10, 1994) is a Ukrainian ski jumper.

Performances

External links

1994 births
Living people
Ukrainian male ski jumpers